Brucheville is a former commune in the Manche department in Normandy in northwestern France. On 1 January 2019, it was merged into the commune Carentan-les-Marais. It is located at the south east corner of the Cherbourg peninsula, about 90 km east of Caen.

World War II
After the liberation of the area by Allied Forces in 1944, engineers of the Ninth Air Force IX Engineering Command began construction of a combat Advanced Landing Ground outside of the town.  Declared operational on 2 August, the airfield was designated as "A-16", it was used by the 36th Fighter Group which flew P-47 Thunderbolts until late August when the unit moved into Central France.  Afterward, the airfield was closed.

Population

See also
Communes of the Manche department

References

Former communes of Manche